The laws of driving under the influence vary between countries. One difference is the acceptable limit of blood alcohol content before a person is charged with a crime.

Africa
The following is a list of the legal blood alcohol content (BAC) limits for drivers in each African country:
Angola: 0.06%
Algeria: 0.02%
Benin: 0.05%
Cape Verde: 0.08%
Central African Republic: 0.08%
Comoros: 0
Congo: 0.05%
Egypt: 0.05%
Equatorial Guinea: 0.15%
Eritrea: 0.03% for commercial or professional drivers, 0.05% for all other drivers
Ethiopia: 0.08
The Gambia: No limit
Ghana: 0.08%
Guinea: 0.08%
Guinea-Bissau: 0.15%
Kenya: 0.08%
Libya: 0
Malawi: 0.08%
Mauritius: 0.05%
Morocco: 0.02%
Namibia: 0.05%
Niger: No limit
Nigeria: 0.05%
Rwanda: 0.08%
Seychelles: 0.08%
South Africa: 0.05% and 0.02% for professional drivers (trucks over 3.5 tonnes, and vehicles carrying passengers for reward)
Togo: No limit
Uganda: 0.08%
Tanzania: Zero for professional or commercial drivers, 0.08% for all other drivers
Zambia: 0.08%

Americas

North America

Canada

Canada: 0.08% BAC by mass

The Criminal Law Amendment Act, 1968–69 made it illegal to drive with a BAC in excess of 80 mg/100 mL of blood. Refusal of a police officer's demand to provide a breath sample was made an offence at the same time and both began as summary conviction offenses, with a maximum fine of up to $5000 and up to six months imprisonment.

Mexico
Mexico: 0.04–0.10%

United States

United States: Depends on state, 0.08% or 0.05% BAC by volume
In the United States, the blood alcohol level at which all states make it unlawful to operate a motor vehicle is 0.08, although it is possible to be convicted of impaired driving at a lower blood alcohol level. Some states define two impaired driving offenses.
The first is the traditional offense, variously called driving under the influence of alcohol (DUI), driving while intoxicated/impaired (DWI), operating under the influence (OUI), or operating while intoxicated/impaired (OWI).
The second and more recent is the so-called illegal per se offense of driving with a blood alcohol concentration (BAC) by volume (mass of alcohol/volume of blood) of 0.08% (previously 0.10%) or higher.

The first offense requires proof of intoxication, although evidence of BAC is admissible as rebuttably presumptive evidence of that intoxication; the second requires only proof of BAC at the time of being in physical control of a motor vehicle. An accused may potentially be convicted of both offenses as a result of a single incident, but may only be punished for one. The differences between state penalties still varies. Wisconsin, for instance, is the only state that continues to treat first offense drunk driving arrests as forfeiture.

Some states also include a lesser charge of driving with a BAC of 0.05%; other states limit this offense to drivers under the age of 21. All states and DC also now have zero tolerance laws: the license of anyone under 21 driving with any detectable alcohol in their bloodstream (BAC limits of 0.01% or 0.02% apply in some states, such as Florida.) will be suspended. In 2009, Puerto Rico joined these states, setting a limit of 0.02 for drivers under 21, despite maintaining a legal drinking age of 18.

The blood alcohol limit for commercial drivers is 0.04%. Pilots of aircraft may not fly within eight hours of consuming alcohol, while under the impairing influence of alcohol or any other drug, or while showing a blood alcohol concentration equal to or greater than 0.04 grams per decilitre of blood.

Utah became the first U.S. state to lower the legal limit to .05% BAC by volume on 24 March 2017. The law went into effect on 30 December 2018. The bill's passage, HB155, was controversial in the state. A poll published on 29 July 2017 found 50 percent of Utahns supported the new law, but 47 percent opposed it.

In most states, the timing of the chemical test for suspected drunk driving is important because the law mandates a result within a given time period after the driving stopped, usually two hours.

Caribbean
 Bahamas: 0.08%
 Cuba: 0 for young or inexperienced drivers and professional or commercial drivers, 0.05% for all other drivers
 Dominican Republic: 0.05%
 Jamaica: The law states that the legal alcohol limit is 35 μg/100 mL alcohol in breath or a blood alcohol level of 80 mg/100 mL alcohol in blood.
 Trinidad and Tobago: 35 μg/(100 mL) BrAC, 80 mg/mL BAC
 Cayman Islands: 0.1 BAC or 0.10%

Central America
Belize: 0.08%
Costa Rica: 0.02% for public transport, commercial drivers and new drivers, or 0.05% for all others results in a fine of CRC 280,000 (US$489.61 as of 27 July 2017). A BAC in excess of 0.05% for public transport, commercial drivers and new drivers or 0.075% for all others additionally results in a 1- to 3-year prison sentence, vehicle impoundment and 2-year licence suspension.
El Salvador: 0.05%
Guatemala: 0.08%
Honduras: 0.07%
Nicaragua: 0.05% 
Panama: 0.08%

South America
Argentina: 0% for public transport and commercial vehicles, 0.02% for motorcycles, and 0.05% for all others. Zero BAC for national and provincial routes and highways in the Province of Córdoba.
Bolivia: 0.05% for professional drivers only
Brazil: Since 2008 Brazil practices zero tolerance. If a driver is found to be driving with any BAC (up to 0.06%), the driver is to have their license suspended for 12 months, pay a fine of BRL 2,934.70 (doubled if recurrence) and will have the car seized. Anything above 0.06% is considered a criminal offense.
Chile: From 15 March 2012, 0.03–0.08% the driver is considered to be driving under the influence and carries a three-month suspension and a fine of US$82–410; over 0.08% the driver is considered to be drunk and carries a prison term of 61 to 301 days, a fine of US$164–820 and a two-year suspension for the first offense, a five-year suspension for a second offense, and a life suspension for a third offense.
Colombia: Colombia is known to have the toughest penalties against those driving under the influence in all of Latin America and practice a zero tolerance policy on DUIs. If a driver is found to be driving with 20–39 mg/100 mL ethanol in blood (equivalent to 0.02–0.039% BAC), the driver is to have their license suspended for a year, pay a fine of US$914, and serve twenty hours of community service. In the most extreme cases, if a driver is found to be driving with grade three alcohol (150 mg/100 mL ethanol in blood), the driver is to have their licence confiscated for ten years, pay a fine of US$7,314, and serve fifty hours of community service. If the driver gets in an accident and causes injuries and or deaths, the driver is to face between 2.5 and eighteen years of prison sentence and their license will be cancelled permanently.
Ecuador: 0.01% for commercial or professional drivers; 0.03% for all other drivers
Guyana: 0.08%
Paraguay: 0
Peru: Drivers below a 0.05% BAC will be given a warning. At a 0.05% and over, the driver will be given a fine and a license suspension of no less than six months and no more than two years. If the driver is involved in an accident without causing death or severe injury to another individual, he or she may possibly face jail time. If the driver causes an accident with a BAC over 0.101%, involving death or severe injury to another party, he or she will receive a mandatory prison sentence of three to five years. The driver's license will also be permanently revoked. 
Suriname: 0.05% 
Uruguay: 0. The driver will have to pay a fine of US$448() and will have their licence suspended. Depending on the concentration of alcohol in blood and the times the driver was found guilty, the suspension goes from a minimum of six months to a maximum of two years. If the driver causes an accident involving death, he or she will be charged with negligent homicide and will face a minimum of six months in prison.
Venezuela: 0.08%

Asia

Central Asia

Mongolia: 0.05%
Turkmenistan: 0.03%

East Asia
Mainland China: 0. Over 0% but under 0.08%: 1,000–2,000 fine, six-month license suspension; Over 0.08%: up to three years' imprisonment, five-year license suspension. If the driver causes serious injuries or death, he or she will be charged with crime and the license will be permanently cancelled.
Hong Kong: 0.05% or BrAC 0.22 mg/L or urine 0.067%. Driving under the influence of alcohol beyond legal limit is punishable with a monetary fine and up to three years' imprisonment, with ten driving-offense points and mandatory Driving Improvement Course.
Japan: BrAC 0.15 mg/L (equivalent to 0.03%). Additionally, regardless of alcohol readings, police may also determine the driver to be "driving drunk", which is punished more severely than exceeding the designated alcohol limits.
South Korea: BAC 0.03%-0.08% : License suspension for 90 days and fine up to KRW 5,000,000(about USD $5,000).BAC 0.08%-0.20% : License revocation for a year and fine up to KRW 10,000,000(about USD $10,000).BAC over 0.2% or DUI caught 3 times : License revocation for indefinite period and imprisonment for up to 5 years and fine up to KRW 20,000,000(about USD $20,000).Drunk driving accident resulting in death : Punishable by up to life imprisonment.
Taiwan: 0.03% (BrAC 0.15 mg/L). The fines vary depending on the vehicle being driven at the time of offence. Scooter and motorcycle drivers convicted of first time DUI offenses will be subject to a fine between NT$15,000 and NT$90,000. Other motorists can be fined between NT$30,000 and NT$120,000 for first-time DUI offenses, while second-time offenders are liable to a fine of NT$120,000. Cyclists and passengers of drunk drivers are also able to be penalised.

South Asia
Afghanistan: 0
India: 0.03%. This is according to section 185 of the Motor Vehicles Act 1988. On a first offence, the punishment is imprisonment of six months, a fine of 10,000 Indian Rupees (INR) or both. If the second offense is committed within three years, the punishment is two years, a fine of 15,000 Indian Rupees (INR) or both. The clause of 30 mg/dL was added by an amendment in 1994. It came into effect beginning 14 November 1994.
Nepal: 0. Breathalyzer testing is regularly used in major cities like Kathmandu, Pokhara, and Biratnagar, and highways. For more verification, driver will be taken to nearest hospitals for blood and urine test (if demanded by the driver). License will be seized instantly. Driver will get the license back after attending anti-alcoholic classes run by Nepal Traffic Police and a NRS 1000 fine will be charged.
Pakistan: Falls under drink and drugs, S. No 14. No set limit. Eight penalty points.
Sri Lanka: 0.06%. Breathalyzer testing is not used routinely. If suspected by police the driver is produced before the closest government medical officer who examines and determines whether the driver is under influence. If the driver refuses examination by the medical officer, they are considered to have been under influence by default.

Southeast Asia
Brunei: 35 micrograms of alcohol in 100 milliliters of breath or 80 milligrams of alcohol in 100 milliliters of blood.
Cambodia: 0.05%
Indonesia: 0
Laos: 80 mg/100 mL of blood.
Malaysia: 0.08%, or 80 mg/100 mL alcohol in blood. According to the Road Traffic (Amendment) Act of 2020, which took effect on 23 October 2020, the following are the alcohol limits imposed by amendment:  22 micrograms of alcohol in 100 milliliters of breath; 50 milligrams of alcohol in 100 milliliters of blood; 67 milligrams of alcohol in 100 milliliters of urine.
Philippines: The Republic Act 10586 or the "Anti-Drunk and Drugged Driving Act of 2013" indicates that blood alcohol content (BAH) should be 0.05% for non-professional drivers and 0.01% for motorcycle riders and professional drivers. A traffic enforcer must first establish probable cause before directing a motorist suspected of DUI to pull over. Then, the motorist should do the following field sobriety tests—the horizontal gaze nystagmus (eye test), the walk-and-turn, and one-leg stand. A breath analyzer shall only be used after the motorist fails these three tests.
Singapore: 0.08% (80 mg/100 mL alcohol blood) or BrAC: 35 μg/100 mL alcohol in breath, strictly enforced.
Thailand: Zero for professional or commercial drivers, 0.05% for all other drivers
Vietnam: 0

Western Asia
Armenia: 0.04%
Azerbaijan: 0
Iran: Not applicable, alcohol is banned
Iraq: 0.04%
Israel: 0.024% 24 mg/100 mL alcohol in breath (penalties only apply above 29 mg/100 mL alcohol in breath due to lawsuits about sensitivity of devices used). New drivers, drivers under 24 years of age and commercial drivers 0.005% 5 mg/100 mL alcohol in breath. 
Jordan: 0.05. Breathalyzer testing is not routinely used. If suspected by police the driver is produced before the closest government medical officer who examines and determines whether the driver is under influence.
Kuwait: Not applicable, alcohol is banned
Lebanon: 0.02%, often unenforced
Saudi Arabia: Not applicable, alcohol is banned
Syria: often unenforced, unless heavily drunk and driving. License revoked for 1 to 3 months. £S2,000 fine.
Turkey: 0.05%, 0 for commercial transport and public service drivers
United Arab Emirates: 0

Europe

Note: Zero usually means below detection limit.
Albania: 0.01%
Austria: 0.05% 0.01% for drivers who have held a license for less than two years and drivers of vehicles over 7.5 tonnes 
Belarus: 0.03%
Belgium: 0.05% Fines and driving bans increase as the alcohol concentration in the blood increases.
Bosnia and Herzegovina: 0.03% for all drivers except for drivers of C, CE, D and DE categories, public service drivers, professional drivers, driving instructors, and drivers younger than 21 years or without 3 years of experience, where the limit is zero
Bulgaria: 0.05%
Croatia: 0.05%. Zero for drivers aged 16 to 24 and professional drivers on duty.
Cyprus: 0.05% or 0.22 gram per liter.
Czech Republic: Zero
Denmark: 0.05% for all motor vehicles, but zero if not driving safely. For first time offenders, 0.05 to 0.12% results in a fine and conditional suspension of the drives license (has to retake the driver's license test and an alcohol-and-vehicles course). Between 0.12 and 0.20% results in a fine and three year complete suspension of the driver's license followed by a new driver's license test and an alcohol-and-vehicles course. Below 0.20%, the fine equals one month's pay after taxes × BAC × 10. Above 0.20%, the perpetrator receives a 20 day conditional prison sentence, a fine equal to one month's pay after taxes, the car usually is confiscated, and the driver's license is completely suspended for three years followed by a new driver's license test, an alcohol-and-vehicles course and a two year period with a breath alcohol ignition interlock device. Regardless of alcohol level, the penalty significantly increases for repeat offenders. There are no exact limits for vehicles without a motor (e.g., bicycles), but if a person is regarded as being incapable of operating one safely it results in a fine.
Estonia: 0.02%
Finland: for motor vehicles, 0.05%, or 0.22 mg/1 L alcohol in breath, aggravated: 0.12% or 0.53 mg/1 L alcohol in breath. The penalty is a fine or jail up to six months plus license suspension from one month to five years. For aggravated, also a prison sentence (sixty days to two years) is possible, usually as a suspended sentence. For users of non-motor vehicles such as bicycles or light electric vehicles, there is no set blood alcohol limit, but endangerment caused by driving while intoxicated is punishable. Routine breath testing, without a probable cause, is permitted and often practiced.
France: 0.05% or 0.02% for new drivers (under three years of driving license) and bus drivers (€135 fine and six demerit points on the driver's license, which can be suspended for three years maximum), 0.08% (aggravated, criminal offense, license suspension for three years, €4,500 fine, and up to two years' imprisonment)
Georgia: 0.03%
Germany: Zero for beginners (less than two years' experience or under the age of 21), professional drivers, bus drivers, truck drivers, and drivers transporting passengers commercially; 0.03% in conjunction with any other traffic offense or accident; 0.05% otherwise. For cyclists, the limit is set at 0.16%, where not in conjunction with any other traffic offense or accident. Starting at 0.16%, cyclists face the same penalties as they would for operating a motor vehicle. Penalties start at a €500 fine and one-month license suspension, fines are means tested based upon one's disposable income. From 0.11%, the penalty is means tested based upon one's disposable income but at minimum a €500 fine and the withdrawal of the driver's license for at least six months, but usually about one year and in some cases, the driving licence is revoked rather than withdrawn (this penalty is set by the court and revocation means a new licence needs to be applied for after the period instated by the court). In certain states (Berlin, Bavaria, Baden-Wurttemburg) an MPU will be ordered from 0.11% in order to be reissued with a new licence after one's revocation period and this also optionally may be ordered (at the authority's discretion) in all other states; from 0.16%, reissue of the licence requires a successful Medical Psychological Assessment (MPU). From 0.11% within ten years of an offense from 0.05%, there is a minimum €1,000 fine and a one-year license withdrawal; the driver has to successfully pass an MPU and is required to prove to the court that they have been sober for the last twelve months, before they can get their licence back. For repeat offenses, the fine is multiplied by the ordinal of the offence (doubled, tripled, etc.), regardless of the amount by which the driver was over the limit. These minimum penalties are usually exceeded by the German courts. From 0.11%, the courts usually also require the DUI offender to do unpaid community service. Note that decisions on licence reinstatement after revocation do not lie with the court but with the local administrative office for driving licenses (Verkehrsamt).
Gibraltar: 0.05%
Greece: 0.05% (BrAC 0.25 mg/L), reduced to 0.02% (BrAC 0.10 mg/L) for unlicensed or new drivers who have held a license for less than two years, motorcycle and professional drivers. Above 0.11% (BrAC 0.60 mg/L) it's considered a flagrant misdemeanour punishable with up to two years of imprisonment and a hefty fine in the court plus the revoking of the driver's licence for six months. Routine breath testing without a probable cause is permitted and practised by the traffic police, especially on weekends and major holidays.
Hungary: 0
Iceland: 0.02%
Republic of Ireland: 0.05% generally or 0.02% for learner drivers, newly qualified drivers (those who have their license for less than two years) and professional drivers, and those who do not have their driving license on them when stopped by the Gardaí (police). Police do not need a reason to request a breath sample. Being convicted of drunk driving usually carries a two-year ban as well as a €1,500 fine.
Italy: From 0.05% to 0.08% (€543–2,170 fine, three to six months' license suspension), from 0.08% to 0.15% (it's an offence, €800–3,200 fine, six to twelve months' license suspension, up to six months' imprisonment), over 0.15% (it's an offence, €1,500–6,000 fine, one to two years' license suspension, six to twelve months' imprisonment, vehicle seizure and confiscation), zero for drivers with less than three years' experience and professional drivers (bus, trucks, etc.). License is always revoked in case of: professional drivers, second offence committed within two years or in case of an accident. If the driver refuses examination he is considered to have been under influence by default applying the over 0.15% rules. Routine breath testing without probable cause is permitted and practiced by various law enforcement agencies.
Latvia: 0.02% for drivers with less than two years of experience and 0.05% for those with more than two years of experience.
Liechtenstein: 0.08%
Lithuania: Zero for taxi, truck, bus, motorcycle drivers, drivers with less than two years of experience and 0.04% for those with more than two years of experience
Luxembourg: 0.02% for professional drivers and drivers with less than two years of experience and 0.05% for the rest (€145 fine and two demerit points on the driving licence if caught). 0.08% earns drivers a citation, 0.12% means loss of license (since 1 October 2007)
Malta: 0.08% Malta is the only EU country with a rate greater than 0.05%. Malta is not able to compute the rate of traffic fatalities due to alcohol.
Moldova: 0.03%
Montenegro: 0.03%
Netherlands: 0.05%, 0.02% for drivers with less than five years' experience (or less than seven years' experience when the driver got his/her license before reaching the age of eighteen). Educational measures or rehabilitation courses are given when disobeying the law. The LEMA (Light Educational Measure Alcohol and traffic) consists of two half-days of 3.5 hours each. LEMA is intended for drivers with a BAC between 0.8‰ and 1.0‰ (between 0.5‰ and 0.8‰ for novice drivers). In the Netherlands, the legal limit for this group of drivers is 0.2‰. The course is compulsory; if refused (or when not participating actively enough), the driving licence is declared invalid. The offender must pay the course fee of €647 (CBR pricelist 2015). The EMA (Educational Measure Alcohol and traffic) is a two-day course (one full day and two half-days) given to people who participated in traffic with a blood alcohol concentration (BAC) between 1.0‰ and 1.3‰ (between 0.8‰ and 1.0‰ for novice drivers). EMA is compulsory: if the offender does not participate (or not actively enough), the driving licence is suspended. In addition, the offender must pay the course fee of €1033 (CBR pricelist 2015).
North Macedonia: Zero for professional drivers, public service drivers, commercial transport and beginner drivers, 0.05% for all others
Norway: 0.02%. Punishment depends on the alcohol level. 0.02% (fine, but one may also risk a suspended licence if any aggravated circumstances are present.), 0.05% (fine, suspended sentence and suspended license), 0.1% (fine, suspended or mandatory sentence and suspended license), 0.15% (fine, mandatory sentence and suspended license). The guidelines state that the fine for an alcohol level of more than 0.05% should be around 1.5 months base salary and usually not lower than 10,000 NOK. For 0.02% to 0.05% the fine is lower. Prison sentences are usually around three weeks to three months with a maximum of one year. The suspension period varies from less than a year to forever, when license is suspended forever, one may apply to get it back after five years.
Poland: 0.02% (misdemeanor, punishable by fine and 10 penalty points, suspended sentence of up to 30 days of jail and possible driving license suspension for up to 3 years), 0.05% (crime, punishable by fine and 10 penalty points, suspended sentence or mandatory sentence of jail up to 2 years, possible driving license suspension from 3 years up). Intoxication is also considered an aggravated circumstance in case of an accident, resulting in a more severe punishment.
Portugal: 0.05%. 0.02% for drivers with less than three years of experience, emergency vehicle drivers, children transportation, drivers younger than 16, taxi drivers, drivers of C, CE, D, DE categories and hazardous material transport drivers.
Romania: 0.00% mg/L. Below 0.40% mg/L alcohol BAC in exhaled air results in highest-category (expensive) civil penalty (between 3,045 RON - 7,250 RON, equivalent of ~630 EUR - 1500 EUR) and suspended license for 3 months. Above 0.40% mg/L BAC in exhaled air results in pursuing criminal action (with or without temporary incarceration, upon circumstances), which most often leads to imprisonment between 1 to 5 years or criminal fine in best cases.
Russian Federation: 0.0356% since 1 September 2013, previously zero since 2010
Serbia: 0.02% for all, zero for motorcycle drivers, professional drivers, public service drivers, commercial transport and beginning drivers
Slovakia: 0
Slovenia: Zero for drivers with three years' experience or less and professional drivers, 0.24 mg/L (0.05%) for all others
Spain: 0.05% BAC (0.25 mg/L BrAC) and 0.03% BAC (0.15 mg/L BrAC) for drivers with less than two years' experience and drivers of freight vehicles over 3.5 tonnes, and of passenger vehicles with more than nine seats. Surpassing the limit is a serious offense, fined with €500. Driving with an alcohol rate over 0.12% is a crime (up to six months' imprisonment and license suspension up to one year).
Sweden: 0.02%. Above 0.1% is considered aggravated. Annually about 2.5 million random tests are performed for alcohol and about twelve thousand tests on suspicion of drugs.
Switzerland: Zero for drivers with less than three years' experience, 0.05% for all others
Ukraine: 0.02%
United Kingdom
England and Wales and Northern Ireland: 80 mg/100 mL (~0.08% BAC) alcohol in blood, 35 μg/100 mL alcohol in breath or 107 mg/100 mL alcohol in urine.
 Scotland: 50 mg/100 mL (~0.05% BAC) alcohol in blood or 22 μg/100 mL alcohol in breath (legislation became effective from 5 December 2014)

United Kingdom
In British law it is a criminal offence to be drunk in charge of a motor vehicle. The definition of "in charge" depends on such things as being in or near the vehicle, and having access to a means of starting the vehicle's engine and driving it away (i.e., the keys to a vehicle). Someone over the limit in a passenger seat can also be prosecuted if the police believe they had been driving or are able to show that there was a likelihood of them driving.

Further rules in the United Kingdom

In the UK, driving or attempting to drive whilst above the legal limit of 0.08% BAC in England, Wales and Northern Ireland, and 0.05% BAC in Scotland or unfit through drink carries a maximum penalty of six months' imprisonment, a fine of up to £5,000 and a minimum twelve months' disqualification. For a second offence committed within ten years of conviction, the minimum ban is three years. Being in charge of a vehicle whilst over the legal limit or unfit through drink could result in three months' imprisonment plus a fine of up to £2,500 and a driving ban. Causing death by careless driving when under the influence of alcohol or other drugs carries a maximum penalty of fourteen years in prison, a minimum two-year driving ban and a requirement to pass an extended driving test before the offender is able to drive legally again.

It is an offence to refuse to provide a specimen of breath, blood or urine for analysis. The penalties for refusing are the same as those for actual drunk driving.

The offence of driving whilst under the influence of alcohol is one to which there is no defence, as such (although defences such as duress or automatism, which are not specific to the offence of driving with excess alcohol, may apply in certain rare circumstances). However, it may be possible to argue that special reasons exist which are such that the offender shouldn't be disqualified from driving despite having committed the offence. Special reasons are notoriously difficult to establish, and the burden of proof is always upon the accused to establish them. Such reasons may include:
 shortness of distance driven
 unintentional commission of the offence (e.g., laced drinks)
 emergencies

Magistrates' sentencing guidelines

In England and Wales, when drink driving offenders appear before a magistrates' court, the magistrates have guidelines they refer to before they decide on a suitable sentence to give the offender. These guidelines are issued by the Sentencing Guidelines Council and cover offences for which sentence is frequently imposed in a magistrates' court when dealing with adult offenders.

Offences can either be tried summarily, which means they can only be heard in the magistrates' court, or they can be an "either way" offence which means magistrates may find their sentencing powers are insufficient and indict the case to a higher Crown Court. The majority of drunk driving offences are summary-only offences which can only be tried in a magistrates' court. The most serious offences, such as a collision with death or injury, must be indicted to Crown Court. The maximum sentence magistrates can usually impose for "being in charge of a vehicle while above the legal limit or unfit through drink" is a £2,500 fine, a three-month prison sentence or a driving ban. The maximum sentence magistrates can usually impose for "driving or attempting to drive while above the legal limit or unfit through drink" is six months' imprisonment, an unlimited fine or a driving ban for at least one year (three years if convicted twice in 10 years). In theory, the fine is means-tested and based on disposable income.

As with England and Wales, road traffic law in Scotland is in the main framed within the Road Traffic Act 1988 as amended. Prosecution and disposal of drink-drive offences is broadly similar to England and Wales with less serious cases prosecuted on complaint through the sheriff summary courts. Cases involving aggravations, life-changing or fatal injuries are prosecuted on indictment via the sheriff solemn or high court. As with most UK-wide legislation, the penalties and sentencing guidelines for drink driving in Scotland mirror those in effect in England and Wales.

Oceania

Australia
Australia: 0.05% BAC by mass
Road laws are state or territory based, but all states and territories have set similar rules. In particular, alcohol must never exceed 0.05g of alcohol in every 100ml of blood; limits for certain categories of drivers are lower, differing in different states.

Australian laws allow police officers to stop any driver and perform a random breath test without reason. Roadblocks can be set up just about anywhere (for example, leading out of town centres on Friday and Saturday nights and after football matches or other major events), where every single driver is breath-tested.

This differs from UK and US laws where police generally need a reason to suspect that the driver is intoxicated before requesting a breath or sobriety test. It is an offence in Australia to refuse to provide a sample of breath when required to, with severe penalties, including prison.

Australian Capital Territory
Zero for drivers or riders holding a learners, provisional, restricted or probationary licence and for drivers operating heavy vehicles over 15t GVM or driving a public vehicle for hire or reward (for example taxi and bus drivers)
0.05% for all other drivers

New South Wales
 Zero for learner and provisional licences
0.02% for drivers of vehicles of "gross vehicle mass" greater than 13.9 tonnes, vehicles carrying dangerous goods or public vehicles such as a taxi or bus
0.05% for all other drivers

Northern Territory
Zero for provisional (probationary) license holders and all motorcyclists
0.05% for all other drivers

Queensland

Zero for the drivers of trucks, buses, articulated vehicles, vehicles carrying dangerous goods, pilot vehicles, taxis, all learner drivers and provisional drivers and RE class licensed motorcyclists in their first twelve months.
0.05% for other drivers

South Australia
Zero for learner, provisional, probationary, heavy (greater than fifteen tonnes) vehicle, taxis, licensed chauffeured vehicles, dangerous goods, and bus licenses.
0.05% for all other drivers

Tasmania

Zero for learner, provisional, truck, bus, and taxi licences
0.05% for all other drivers

Victoria

Zero for unlicensed drivers, holders of learner permits and probationary licences, "professional" drivers, and certain relicensed drunk-drivers.
0.05% for all other drivers.

There are also other restrictions for drivers in Victoria:
Limits apply within three hours of driving - that is, police can require a person to submit to an alcohol or drugs test within three hours of driving and it is an offence to fail that test, unless the drug or alcohol use occurred after driving (see Road Safety Act 1986, ss. 49, 53 and 55E).
Licences cancelled for certain serious drink-driving offences may only be reissued after obtaining a court order. This is the case for repeat offenders, and first offenders above 0.15%. In such cases, the relicensed driver is subject to a 0 limit for three years following relicensing, or for as long as the person is required to use an alcohol interlock.
Alcohol interlocks must be imposed whenever a repeat drunk-driver is relicensed.
A court also has discretion to impose an alcohol interlock when relicensing a first offender in certain serious cases, generally when the offence involves a BAC by mass of 0.15% or higher.
The law requires interlocks to be used for certain minimum periods, but the requirement to use an interlock does not automatically end at the completion of the minimum period. Once that period has expired, an individual may apply to a court to have the interlock condition removed from their driver's licence. The State Police must be given notice of the application and may make submissions to the court on whether the interlock condition should be removed. The court will also take into account data recorded by the interlock itself (e.g., whether any attempts were made to start the vehicle by a person who had been drinking).
Driving without an interlock when one is required carries severe penalties, including imprisonment.
If a doctor treats any patient not under fifteen years of age as a result of a motor vehicle accident, the patient must allow the doctor to take a blood sample for testing for alcohol and drug content in a way that preserves the chain of evidence. If this process is skipped the doctor may not be able to discover the alcohol blood level. The results can be used as evidence in subsequent court proceedings.
The law allows a police officer to require any driver (or any person who has driven a vehicle within the last three hours) to perform a random saliva test for methamphetamine, cannabis and MDMA, all of which are subject to a zero limit (per Road Safety Act 1986: ss. 49, 55E & 55D)

Western Australia

Zero for learner and probationary licence-holders and persons convicted of driving under the influence or failing to comply with a request for breath, blood or urine (for three years after the offense).
0.05% for all other drivers.

Driving with 0.15% BAC by mass and above (legally defined as Drunk Driving) is a distinct offence from having over 0.08% but under 0.15% BAC, and is subject to heavier penalties. Persistent offenders may be barred from driving for terms up to and including life, and may be imprisoned.

The law allows a police officer to require any driver to perform a random saliva test for methamphetamine, cannabis or MDMA, all of which are subject to a zero limit.

New Zealand
New Zealand operates a program called Compulsory Breath Testing, which allows police to stop motorists at any time without having any reason to do so. CBT is usually carried out at roadside checkpoints but mobile patrol cars can also randomly stop motorists to administer a test. The police also carry out roadside drug tests upon motorists they suspect have used drugs.

The system in New Zealand is age-based. The limits are:

 Zero for people under twenty years
 0.05% BAC or 250μg/L breath for people twenty years and over

The penalties for exceeding the limits are:
 People under twenty years, up to 0.03% BAC, 150 μg/L breath: instant NZ$200 fine and fifty demerit points
 People under twenty years, 0.03–0.08% BAC, 150–400 μg/L breath: up to three months' imprisonment, up to NZ$2,250 fine or both. Loss of license for three months or more.
 People twenty years and over, 0.051–0.08% BAC, 251–400 μg/L breath: instant NZ$200 fine and fifty demerit points. Twelve-hour prohibition from driving immediately after test.
 All people over 0.08% BAC, 400 μg/L breath (first and second offenses): up to three months' imprisonment, up to NZ$4,500 fine or both; loss of license for six months or more
 All people over 0.08% BAC, 400 μg/L breath (third and subsequent offenses): two years' imprisonment; NZ$6,000 fine; loss of license for one year or more

Note that penalties apply to the lowest reading taken across both breath and blood tests. For example, if a driver twenty years or over has a breath test result of 426 μg/L but a subsequent blood test returns 0.077% BAC, then the driver is not charged with any drink driving offense despite the breath reading being over the breath alcohol limit. The penalty for injuring or killing someone when under the influences is the same as dangerous driving (up to ten years' imprisonment, up to NZ$20,000 or both, and loss of license for one year or more).

Other countries in Oceania
French Polynesia: 0.05%
Micronesia: 0.05%
Palau: Zero for new or inexperienced drivers and commercial or professional drivers, 0.10% for all other drivers

See also 
 DWI court
 Expungement
 Sobriety checkpoints

References

External links

Government agencies
Alcohol and Drugs from the New Zealand Transport Agency.
Drink Driving from healthdirect, the Australian Government Department of Health.
Drinking and Drug Driving from Gov.UK.
Impaired Driving, from the Ontario, Canada Ministry of Transportation.
Impaired Driving, from MedlinePlus.

Organizations
Blood Alcohol Concentration (BAC) Limits from the International Alliance for Responsible Drinking.
Campaign Against Drinking and Driving
Interventions to reduce road traffic injuries: reducing drink-driving, from the World Health Organization's Global Health Observatory (GHO) data.

 
 Drunk driving
By Country
Criminal law by country